Aon PLC is an American multinational financial services firm that sells a range of risk-mitigation products, including Commercial Risk, Investment, Wealth, Health and Reinsurance solutions. The firm also provides data and analytics services, strategy consulting through Aon Inpoint and investment banking advisory through Aon Securities. Aon has approximately 50,000 employees in 120 countries.

Founded in Chicago by Patrick Ryan, Aon was created in 1982 when the Ryan Insurance Group merged with the Combined Insurance Company of America. In 1987, that company was renamed Aon from aon, a Gaelic word meaning "one". The company is globally headquartered in London with its North America operations based in Chicago at the Aon Center. Aon is listed on the New York Stock Exchange under AON.

History
W. Clement Stone's mother bought a small Detroit insurance agency, and in 1918 brought her son into the business. Mr. Stone sold low-cost, low-benefit accident insurance, underwriting and issuing policies on-site. The next year he founded his own agency, the Combined Registry Co.

As the Great Depression began, Stone reduced his workforce and improved training. Forced by his son's respiratory illness to winter in the South, Stone moved to Arkansas and Texas. In 1939 he bought American Casualty Insurance Co. of Dallas, Texas. It was consolidated with other purchases as the Combined Insurance Co. of America in 1947. The company continued through the 1950s and 1960s, continuing to sell health and accident policies. In the 1970s, Combined expanded overseas despite being hit hard by the recession.

In 1982, after 10 years of stagnation under Clement Stone Jr., the elder Stone, then 79, resumed control until the completion of a merger with Ryan Insurance Co. allowed him to transfer control to Patrick Ryan. Ryan, the son of a Ford dealer in Wisconsin and graduate of Northwestern University, had started his company as an auto credit insurer in 1964. In 1976, the company bought the insurance brokerage units of the Esmark conglomerate. Ryan focused on insurance brokering and added more upscale insurance products. He also trimmed staff and took other cost-cutting measures, and in 1987 he changed Combined's name to Aon. In 1992, he bought Dutch insurance broker Hudig-Langeveldt. In 1995, the company sold its remaining direct life insurance holdings to General Electric to focus on consulting.

Aon built a global presence through purchases. In 1997, it bought The Minet Group, as well as insurance brokerage Alexander & Alexander Services, Inc. in a deal that made Aon (temporarily) the largest insurance broker worldwide. The firm made no US buys in 1998, but doubled its employee base with purchases including Spain's largest retail insurance broker, Gil y Carvajal, and the formation of Aon Korea.

Responding to industry demands, Aon announced its new fee disclosure policy in 1999, and the company reorganised to focus on buying personal line insurance firms and to integrate its acquisitions. That year it bought Nikols Sedgwick Group, an Italian insurance firm, and formed RiskAttack (with Zurich US), a risk analysis and financial management concern aimed at technology companies. The cost of integrating its numerous purchases, however, hammered profits in 1999.

Despite its troubles, in 2000 Aon bought Reliance Group's accident and health insurance business, as well as Actuarial Sciences Associates, a compensation and employee benefits consulting company. Later in that year, however, the company decided to cut 6% of its workforce as part of a restructuring effort. In 2003, the company saw revenues increase primarily because of rate hikes in the insurance industry. Also that year, Endurance Specialty, a Bermuda-based underwriting operation that Aon helped to establish in November 2001 along with other investors, went public. The next year Aon sold most of its holdings in Endurance.

In late 2007, Aon announced the divestiture of its underwriting business. With this move, the firm sold off its two major underwriting subsidiaries: Combined Insurance Company of America (acquired by ACE Limited for $2.4 billion) and Sterling Life Insurance Company (purchased by Munich Re Group for $352 million). The low margin and capital-intensive nature of the underwriting industry was the primary reason for the firm's decision to divest.

This growth strategy manifested in November 2008 when Aon announced it had acquired reinsurance intermediary and capital advisor Benfield Group Limited for $1.75 billion. The acquisition amplified the firm's broking capabilities, positioning Aon one of the largest players in the reinsurance brokerage industry.

In 2010, Aon made its most significant acquisition to date with the purchase of Hewitt Associates for $4.9 billion. Aside from drastically boosting Aon's human resources consulting capacity and entering the firm into the business process outsourcing industry, the move added 23,000 colleagues and more than $3 billion in revenue.

In January 2012, Aon announced that its headquarters would be moved to London, although North American operations and jobs remained in Chicago.

On 10 February 2017, Aon announced that it was selling its employee benefits outsourcing business to private equity firm The Blackstone Group for US$4.8 billion (£3.8 billion).

In February 2020, Aon named Eric Andersen as president of Aon after co-president Michael O'Connor departed the company to pursue new opportunities. He will be reporting to Greg Case, the firm's CEO.

In June 2020, Aon announced it was planning to repay the temporary 20% pay cut from 70% of employees that was published in a statement in April 2020 regarding the COVID-19 pandemic. On 30 June 2020, Aon announced it would repay staff in full, plus 5% of the withheld amount.

In June 2020 Willis Towers Watson called its shareholders to two meetings to discuss its acquisition with Aon for August 26, 2020. It was revealed that the US Department of Justice has requested more information on the deal under antitrust rules.

September 11 attacks
Aon's New York offices were on the 92nd and 98th–105th floors of the South Tower of the World Trade Center at the time of the September 11 attacks. When the North Tower was struck by American Airlines Flight 11 at 8:46 a.m., an evacuation of Aon's offices was quickly initiated by executive Eric Eisenberg, and 924 of the estimated 1,100 Aon employees present at the time managed to get below the 77th floor before United Airlines Flight 175 crashed between Floors 77 and 85 at 9:03 a.m.

Many, however, did not manage to get beneath in the 17 minutes they had between the two impacts. As a result, 176 employees of Aon were killed in the crash or died in the fires or from smoke inhalation. At 9:59 a.m., the tower finally collapsed, killing any survivors still within, including Eisenberg and Kevin Cosgrove.

Spitzer investigation
In 2004–2005, Aon, along with other brokers including Marsh & McLennan and Willis, fell under regulatory investigation under New York Attorney General Eliot Spitzer and other state attorneys general. At issue was the practice of insurance companies' payments to brokers (known as contingent commissions). The payments were thought to bring a conflict of interest, swaying broker decisions on behalf of carriers, rather than customers. In the spring of 2005, without acknowledging any wrongdoing, Aon agreed to a $190 million settlement, payable over 30 months.

UK regulatory breach
In January 2009, Aon was fined £5.69 million in the UK by the Financial Services Authority, who stated that the fine related to the company's inadequate bribery and corruption controls, claiming that between 14 January 2005 and 30 September 2007 Aon had failed to properly assess the risks involved in its dealings with overseas firms and individuals. The Authority did not find that any money had actually made its way to illegal organisations. Aon qualified for a 30% discount on the fine as a result of its cooperation with the investigation. Aon said its conduct was not deliberate, adding it had since "significantly strengthened and enhanced its controls around the usage of third parties".

US Foreign Corrupt Practices Act violations
In December 2011, Aon Corporation paid a $16.26 million penalty to the U.S. Securities and Exchange Commission (SEC) and the U.S. Department of Justice (DOJ) for violations of the US Foreign Corrupt Practices Act (FCPA).
According to the SEC, Aon's subsidiaries made improper payments of over $3.6 million to government officials and third-party facilitators in Costa Rica, Egypt, Vietnam, Indonesia, the United Arab Emirates, Myanmar and Bangladesh, between 1983 and 2007, to obtain and retain insurance contracts.

Major acquisitions
On 5 January 2007, Aon announced that its Aon Affinity group had acquired the WedSafe Wedding Insurance program.

On 22 August 2008, Aon announced that it had acquired London-based Benfield Group. The acquiring price was US$1.75 billion or £935 million, with US$170 million of debt.

On 5 March 2010, Hewitt Associates announced that it acquired Senior Educators Ltd. The acquisition offers companies a new way to address retiree medical insurance commitments.

On 12 July 2010, Aon announced that it had agreed to buy Lincolnshire, Illinois-based Hewitt Associates for $4.9 billion in cash and stock.

On 7 April 2011, Aon announced that it had acquired Johannesburg, South Africa-based Glenrand MIB. Financial terms were not disclosed.

On 19 July 2011, Aon announced that it bought Westfield Financial Corp., the owner of insurance-industry consulting firm Ward Financial Group, from Ohio Farmers Insurance Co. Financial terms were not disclosed.

On 22 October 2012, Aon announced that it agreed to buy OmniPoint, Inc, a Workday consulting firm. Financial terms were not disclosed.

On 16 June 2014, Aon announced that it agreed to buy National Flood Services, Inc., a large processor of flood insurance, from Stoneriver Group, L.P.

On 31 October 2016, Aon's Aon Risk Solutions completed acquisition of Stroz Friedberg LLC, a specialised risk management firm focusing on cybersecurity.

On 14 November 2016, Aon acquired CoCubes an online Indian Assessment firm, facilitating hiring of entry-level engineering graduates.

On 10 February 2017, Aon plc agreed to sell its human resources outsourcing platform for US$4.8 billion (£3.8 billion) to Blackstone Group L.P. (BX.N), creating a new company called Alight Solutions.

In September 2017, Aon announced its intent to purchase real estate investment management firm The Townsend Group from Colony NorthStar for $475 million, expanding Aon's property investment management portfolio.

On 9 March 2020, Aon announced its merger with Willis Towers Watson for nearly $30 billion in an all-stock deal that creates the world's largest insurance broker. As of 21 May 2020, Willis board was under probe over merger agreement with Aon. The deal was called off in July 2021.

Operations

Manchester United
On 3 June 2009, it was reported that Aon had signed a four-year shirt sponsorship deal with English football giant Manchester United. On 1 June 2010, Aon replaced American insurance company AIG as the principal sponsor of the club. The Aon logo was prominently displayed on the front of the club's shirts until the 2014/2015 season when Chevrolet replaced them. The deal was said to be worth £80 million over four years, replacing United's deal with AIG as the most lucrative shirt deal in history at the time.

In April 2013, Aon signed a new eight-year deal with Manchester United to rename their training ground as the Aon Training Complex and sponsor the club's training kits, reportedly worth £180 million to the club.

Awards
 Aon was awarded Investment Consultancy of the Year and Fiduciary Manager of the Year at the FT's 2014 Pension and Investment Provider Awards
 Aon received a perfect score on the Human Rights Campaign's 2013 Corporate Equality Index
 Aon was named to Working Mother's list of the 100 Best Companies for 2012
 Aon Risk Solutions was the most recommended broker in 2012 for service and expertise by middle market buyers in Business Insurance's Buyers Choice Awards
 Aon Risk Solutions was named Broker of the Year and Training Programme of the Year in 2012 by Insurance Times
 Aon Benfield was named 2012 European Reinsurance Broker of the Year, Best European Property Reinsurance Broker and Best European Casualty Reinsurance Broker at the European Intelligent Insurer Awards
 Aon Benfield was named Best Global Reinsurance Broking Company for Analytics at Reactions Global Awards 2012
 Aon Hewitt was named Top Retirement Consultant of 2012 by PLANSPONSOR Magazine2
 Aon Hewitt was named Actuarial and Investment Consultant of the Year for 2012 at the Professional Pensions Awards

References

External links

Actuarial firms
Companies based in London
Financial services companies based in the City of London
Financial services companies established in 1982
Companies listed on the New York Stock Exchange
Financial services companies of the United States
Consulting firms established in 1982
Tax inversions
Risk management companies
Human resource management consulting firms
Insurance companies of the United Kingdom
International management consulting firms
Management consulting firms of the United Kingdom
Consulting firms of the United States
British brands
1982 establishments in Michigan